The Cruise is a British reality television series that debuted on ITV on 3 March 2016. It is narrated by Hugh Bonneville. The series includes behind the scenes operations of the Regal Princess, Royal Princess, and Star Princess, all  owned by Princess Cruises.

The Cast
Emma Morgan,
Timothy Gallant and
Scott Grayson

Premise
Aired on a weekly basis, the show follows passengers and crew aboard. The series has many reoccurring staff detailing the experiences of their day to day life on board, such as Timothy Gallant, Emma Morgan, Scott Grayson and David McDonald.

Series overview

Episodes

Series 1 (2016)

Series 2 – Sailing the Mediterranean (2017)

Series 3 – Return to the Mediterranean (2018)

Series 4 – Voyage to Alaska (2018)

References

External links
 
 The Cruise at ITV Press Centre

2016 British television series debuts
2018 British television series endings
2010s British reality television series
ITV reality television shows
English-language television shows